A by-election was held for the Dewan Rakyat seat of Rompin, Pahang in Malaysia on 5 May following the nomination day on 22 April 2015. The seat fell vacant after member of parliament Jamaluddin Jarjis, from Barisan Nasional died in a helicopter crash in Semenyih, Selangor. Jamaluddin Jarjis won the seat with a majority of 15,114 votes in the general elections in 2013, beating Pan-Malaysian Islamic Party (PAS)'s Mohd Nuridah Salleh.

The Rompin by-election was a straight contest between ruling party United Malays National Organisation (UMNO)'s Hasan Arifin and opposition PAS's Nazri Ahmad.

BN held the seat, albeit with their majority slashed by almost half.

Results

References 

2015 elections in Malaysia
2015 Rompin by-election
Elections in Pahang